The Super Coupe de Madagascar is a football competition between the winners of the THB Champions League and the Coupe de Madagascar.

List of winners
1994: AS Cimelta
2006: AS Adema 1-0 Ajesaia
2007: Ajesaia p 1-1 AS Adema
2008: AS ADEMA (Antananarivo) 4-2 Académie Ny Antsika (aet)
2009: Ajesaia 1-0 AS ADEMA (aet)
2010: CNaPS Sport 3-2 AS ADEMA

External links
Madagascar - List of Cup Winners, RSSSF.com

Football competitions in Madagascar
Madagascar